is a sub-kilometer asteroid, classified as near-Earth object and potentially hazardous asteroid of the Apollo group. Based on absolute magnitude, it is the third largest asteroid known to have passed closer than the Moon.

Description 

It was discovered on 27 May 1998, by astronomers of the Lincoln Near-Earth Asteroid Research (LINEAR) at Lincoln Laboratory's ETS near Socorro, New Mexico, at an apparent magnitude of 17.6 using a  reflector. It was tracked through 9 June 1998. It was recovered on 28 December 2003 which extended the observation arc by 5 years. Two precovery images from January 1990 extended the observation arc by 8 years.

It is one of the largest objects known to have come inside the orbit of the moon. During the 1914 close approach the asteroid reached about apparent magnitude 7.7.

References

External links 
 
 
 

152680
152680
152680
19980527